Héctor Antonio García Hernandez (November 19, 1930 - July 15, 2022) was a Cuban-American classical guitarist and composer. He established the first guitar departments in United States universities, at the College of St. Joseph on the Rio Grande in 1963 and the University of New Mexico at Albuquerque in 1967, where he taught for about 20 years.

Biography 
García was born in Havana, Cuba. He received the degrees of Master of Guitar and Master of Music from the Peyrellade Conservatory, joining their faculty upon graduation in 1954.

He chose to leave Cuba to escape the communist regime at the age of 30, buying a two-way ticket from Havana to Miama, Florida (but using only one part of the ticket). He sought and was granted asylum in the United States with support of family and friends. He returned to Cuba as part of the unsuccessful Bay of Pigs Invasion, was captured, and was imprisoned. In prison, he worked on the first of two unpublished concertos, convinced his captors to "find him a guitar". With this guitar, he formed a makeshift studio in prison with other students. Some went on to become accomplished musicians and professors.

After two years imprisonment, García was released ($50,000 was paid by the Kennedy administration to Fidel Castro and returned to the U.S., where became a concert guitarist and educator, performing worldwide with major orchestras, including the Havana Symphony, Los Angeles Sinfonietta, New Mexico Symphony Orchestra, and the Dupont Consortium in Washington D.C. He appeared on The Ed Sullivan Show and founded the first academic department dedicated to classical guitar at the University of New Mexico. Mario Castelnuovo-Tedesco dedicated a composition (Op. 170/39) Cancion Cubana to Hector Garcia.

García studied with Emilio Pujol (a pupil of Francisco Tárrega) and he was appointed assistant in 1969, not only to improve his mastery of the guitar and vihuela but also to help Pujol develop musical materials and notes and to conduct master classes attended by advanced students and performing artists worldwide. García adopted and expanded upon the traditions of both Tárrega and Pujol. Some of these influences led him to adopt a "no-nails" approach for guitar playing, which runs counter to the contemporary trend in classical guitar for players to grow the nails of the right hand used to pluck strings. The nails are grown and shaped to optimize sound production, but in the "no-nails" approach, the nails are cut short so that fingertips contact the string directly. The technique produces a sound that has a distinctive, softer characteristic, although the control is often more difficult, especially in passages requiring a rapid arpeggio or tremolo  technique. The "no-nails" approach remains controversial amongst contemporary classical guitarists.

His grandson “jeffreyalexander.” Is one the guitarists of the Metal Band Ascendence & has solo work as well , he is the new generation of guitarists in Hectors family . 

Garcia married Jeanne Marie Baum November 12, 1988. He last resided with his family in Idaho (he previously lived in Albuquerque, New Mexico and Miami, Florida).

Concert review 
On November 27, 1973 La Mañana, a newspaper in Lérida, Spain, published this review of a concert Héctor García gave (translated by Lew Critchfield). Juan Riera was the reviewer.
 
On more than one occasion we have questioned the motives and influences of today's concert guitarists as to the exclusion of the "Sonatas" and Fantasias" of Fernando Sor. These two forms are the most noble of all this composer's works for the guitar, his musicality and his genius. An answer might be, as overheard in a discussion between a professor regarding the past with the judgement of a performing guitarist, that the length of such works and the difficulties in the conscientious study of them require of concert players a deep understanding and importance in the history of the guitar, the societal atmosphere of the entire period and the esthetic currents  governing artistic expression. In another vein, the music of Sor (Sonatas and Fantasias) is out of phase in relation to our present day mindset and practices, actually we lack the foundation necessary.

Regarding this we find the meritorious programming by Héctor García in which he included one of the most interesting sonatas by the Catalán composer Fernando Sor. It was dedicated by Sor to Ignacio Pleyel, a famous composer, pianist and founder of a company producing Pleyel Pianos. It was obvious that Héctor García belongs to that category of interpreters whose honest execution does not permit concessions. Ones which, the knowledgeable are aware, he must not enslave himself to these current  mannerisms and cave in to popular trends. The artist must offer the values contained in the History of Music's long held traditions. In this way the artist enriches the audience's appreciation and understanding of what they have heard.

There is not the least doubt, the Fantasia of Sor we heard favors the above principles and probably has not been heard since Sor's death in 1839. It is a model of the classical era on the guitar and illustrates why those who knew called him the "Beethoven of the guitar".  For this reason it deserves to be studied  and offered to the public to hear such admirable polyphonic qualities expressed on the guitar.

The first part of the program was no less remarkable. There was a Cuban song by Mario Castel-Nuevo Tedesco dedicated to Maestro Héctor García. Using an original system assigning pitches to the alphabet, Tedesco's theme was derived from Héctor's first and last names. This part concluded with two exquisite songs by Mexican composer Manuel Ponce followed by Ponce's Theme, Variations and Finale. Its virtuosity has made it a popular concert piece among today's guitarists.

 The second half was dedicated entirely to Emilio Pujol; a concert study dedicated to Scarlatti followed by four Spanish character pieces which are the most significant of this Catalán composer's catalogue of original works.
Héctor García's technique identifies fully with the "School of Tárrega" which Pujol methodically amplified. García's special attribute is his spirituality and his full and confident consideration of the logic serving Art on the guitar. In other words, denying oneself to better serve the Art.

One characteristic of the "Tárrega School" is striking the notes with only the fingertips. His passion and quest was to emulate the sonority of the classical string quartet. Use of just the tip, he imagined and then realized, was the only way to get a pleasing result. With this came a resurgence of fingertip playing. It had been used by the prestigious Renaissance composer Fuenllana and two centuries later by Fernando Sor.

Héctor García, convinced that the excellence of sound produced by the fingertips and following Tárrega's example, in a single stroke revived the long lost art and its rewards. He neither imposes false mannerisms nor uses convenient prejudices.

With that approach the works of Emilio Pujol were heard with complete fullness of their character. Héctor García has conscientiously studied Pujol's works and in no way diminished their esthetic sentiment. They were played with fluid facility and sonority which only fingertip playing can bring to the guitar's music. This second half of his program embodied a faithful and true hommage to Pujol.

This writer is fully convinced that the matters written of at the beginning of this review requires a "Pujolistic era" something we have desired for a long time. Emilio Pujol's music is surely not easy to interpret yet essentially guitaristic and should not be absent from guitarists' concerts. That which has true value cannot be ignored eternally. It is apparent the International Concursos of Cervera were a revelation to the young artists attending. They discovered music unknown to them. In the final concerts of the concourse we heard from players the profound musical shading demanded by Pujol. The conviviality of the Maestro throughout the concurso awakened the attendees' desire to study his works. The repercussions, like a rock thrown in the middle of a pond, spread his music throughout the international guitar world.

Summing up, the interpretations of Héctor García, in my honest judgement, offered a selection of essentially guitaristic works, difficult to interpret and to express. Thankfully his diligence in developing his technique by way of thorough studies, gave him domination of whatever problems arose. The strings, the frets and the spirit were dominated by the facility of his fingers and fully expressing his dynamic concepts. Surely technique can be capricious and uneven, on a good day a player may execute them well and on others only give the impression of doing them well.

In Héctor García we saw today a guitarist who is perhaps the best prepared to reveal the principles of Tárrega on the concert stages of the world.

The large audience applauded enthusiastically bringing him back for an encore for which he played "Guajira Cubana".

References 

1930 births
American classical guitarists
American male guitarists
Cuban guitarists
20th-century American guitarists
20th-century American male musicians
Cuban male guitarists